The Gallery: Live Sessions is a collaborative compilation album mixed by Euro House DJ/producer Tall Paul and Benny Benassi. It was released in 2005 as a double disc album, the first disc being mixed by Tall Paul and the second disc being mixed by Benny Benassi.

Track listing

Disc 1 (Tall Paul)
Tall Paul & Dave Aude - "Common Ground" – 6:30
Steve Lawler & Za Za La Boom - "Illectronic" – 4:50
Dave Spoon - "Who You Are" – 4:42
TDR - "Smoked Out" – 5:53
Deux - "Sun Rising Up" – 6:15
Erik E - "Ya Don't Stop" – 3:59
Tell Paul - "Got It" (Jark Prongo Remix & Original) – 3:43
Max Graham - "Time & Again" – 5:56
Gabriel & Dresden - "Arcadia " – 6:41
Pryda - "Human Behavior" – 5:55
Darren Christian & John Johnson - "Electrify" – 6:51
DT8 Project featuring Andrea Britton - "Winter" (Maxx Graham's Sidechain Remix) – 7:39

Disc 2 (Benny Benassi)
Chelonis R. Jones - "The Rush (Sex With Machines)" – 4:44
Mark Knight & MTV featuring E-Man - "A New Reality" (Dub Mix) – 4:48
DJ Koze - "Brutalga Square" – 5:35
Konfekt - "Ra (Bammel)" – 3:39
Agoria - "La Onzieme Marche" – 4:49
Alex Neri - "Aurora" – 8:11
Michael Burns pres. Blue Haze - "Into Nothing" – 6:47
Pinktronix - "Song About Nothing" (Swayzak Remix) – 4:53
Swayzak - "Bergerie" – 4:47
Etienne De Crecy & Alex Gopher - "Overnet" – 6:43
FB - "Who's Knockin'?" (Instrumental Club Mix) – 7:16
Etienne De Crecy & Boom Bass - "Bit Torrent"

External links
 

DJ mix albums
Benny Benassi albums
Split albums
2005 compilation albums